The 2009 Big South Conference baseball tournament  was the postseason baseball tournament for the Big South Conference, held from May 19 through 23 at McCormick Field, home field of UNC Asheville in Asheville, North Carolina.  The top eight teams participated in the double-elimination tournament. The champion, won the title for the tenth time, and earned an invitation to the 2009 NCAA Division I baseball tournament.

Format
The top eight finishers from the round-robin regular season qualified for the tournament.  The teams were seeded one through eight based on conference winning percentage.  The bottom seeds played a single elimination play-in round, with the two winners joining the top four seeds in a six team double-elimination tournament.

Bracket and results

Play-in round

Double-elimination rounds

All-Tournament Team

Most Valuable Player
David Anderson was named Tournament Most Valuable Player.  Anderson was a first baseman for Coastal Carolina.

References

Tournament
Big South Conference Baseball Tournament
Big South baseball tournament
Big South Conference baseball tournament